The 9th Golden Rooster Awards honoring the best in mainland China film, was given in Guanzhou, Guangdong Province.

Winners and nominees

References

External links 
 The 9th Golden Rooster Awards

1989
Golden
1989 in China
1980s in Chinese cinema